Tomio Hosoda (細田 富男, 19 January 1926 – 27 July 2008) was a Japanese sprinter. He competed in the men's 100 metres at the 1952 Summer Olympics.

Competition record

References

1926 births
2008 deaths
Place of birth missing
Japanese male sprinters
Olympic male sprinters
Olympic athletes of Japan
Athletes (track and field) at the 1952 Summer Olympics
Asian Games gold medalists for Japan
Asian Games bronze medalists for Japan
Asian Games medalists in athletics (track and field)
Athletes (track and field) at the 1951 Asian Games
Athletes (track and field) at the 1954 Asian Games
Medalists at the 1951 Asian Games
Medalists at the 1954 Asian Games
Japan Championships in Athletics winners
20th-century Japanese people